Mount Smith is a mountain over 1,400 m, standing north of Mawson Glacier and 7 miles (11 km) north-northwest of Mount Murray  in the Prince Albert Mountains in Victoria Land, Antarctica. Discovered by the Discovery Expedition (1901–04), which probably named this peak for W. E. Smith, Chief Naval Constructor, who prepared the plans and supervised construction of the expedition ship RRS Discovery.

Mountains of Victoria Land
Prince Albert Mountains
Scott Coast